Simi Peak is the highest peak in the Simi Hills of Southern California, at .

Geography
Simi Peak is located in eastern Ventura County, California, near the cities of Simi Valley to the north, and Thousand Oaks to the west.

Nearby peaks

Chatsworth Peak is a peak that is also located in Simi Hills, on the far eastern edge. Escorpión Peak (Castle Peak) is closer in the hills, at 1,475 feet (450 m) and located in El Escorpión Park to the east.

Parks; and recreation
The peak is in the Cheeseboro and Palo Comado Canyons Open Space park, part of the NPS Santa Monica Mountains National Recreation Area system. Simi Peak is accessible by trail, with trailheads in the towns of Simi Valley, Thousand Oaks, and Agoura Hills, and by trails connecting from the Upper Las Virgenes Canyon Open Space Preserve.

See also
Index: Simi Hills

References

External links

NPS Cheeseboro—Palo Comado — Official Cheeseboro Canyon—Palo Comado Canyon Park website
L.A.Mountains Cheeseboro Canyon Park information
L.A.Mountains official Upper Las Virgenes Canyon Park website.
Ventura County Trails.org Simi Hills Preserves trails website.
Upper Las Virgenes Canyon - Park Geology information

Simi Hills
Mountains of Ventura County, California
Santa Monica Mountains National Recreation Area
Mountains of Southern California